Crazy Elephant was an American bubblegum pop band noted for their 1969 hit single, "Gimme Gimme Good Lovin'".  Crazy Elephant was a studio concoction, the Marzano-Calvert Studio Band, created by Jerry Kasenetz and Jeffry Katz of Super K Productions, promoted in Cash Box magazine as allegedly being a group of Welsh coal miners:

Former Cadillacs member Robert Spencer was widely utilized on lead vocals, though future 10cc member Kevin Godley took lead vocals on "There Ain't No Umbopo", recorded at Strawberry Studios in Stockport, England, and released on the Bell label in May 1970.  A touring group was formed later for promotional purposes.  The bassist on "Gimme Gimme Good Lovin'" was Norman Marzano, part of the Marzano-Calvert studio group.  The song was covered by Detroit band Adrenalin featuring vocalist David Larson in 1979 and later by Helix.

Crazy Elephant's "Gimme Gimme Good Lovin'" (b/w "The Dark Part of My Mind") was a transatlantic one-hit wonder, making number 12 on both the U.S. Billboard Hot 100 chart and the UK Singles Chart. Several follow-up singles, including "Gimme Some More" (b/w "My Baby (Honey Pie)") and "Sunshine Red Wine" (b/w "Pam"), failed to chart.

The band also released a self-titled album in 1969 featuring:
Robert Spencer (vocals)
Kenny Cohen (flute, saxophone, vocals), who later performed with The Eagles, Santana, Rod Stewart and B. B. King
Bob Avery (drums), who also played with The Music Explosion
Larry Laufer (keyboards, vocals)
Hal King (vocals)
Ronnie Bretone (bass)

Discography

Singles

Albums

See also
List of 1960s one-hit wonders in the United States
Doctor Father

References

American pop music groups
Bell Records artists